The 2009 ATP Challenger Trophy was a professional tennis tournament played on outdoor red clay courts. It was the third edition of the tournament which was part of the 2009 ATP Challenger Tour. It took place in Trnava, Slovakia between 21 and 27 September 2009.

Singles main draw entrants

Seeds

 Rankings are as of 14 September 2009.

Other entrants
The following players received wildcards into the singles main draw:
  Jaroslav Pospíšil
  Marek Semjan
  Bohdan Ulihrach
  Lukas Weinhandl

The following players received entry from the qualifying draw:
  György Balázs
  Cătălin Gârd
  Andrej Martin
  Grzegorz Panfil

Champions

Singles

 Oleksandr Dolgopolov Jr. def.  Lamine Ouahab, 6–2, 6–2

Doubles

 Grigor Dimitrov /  Teymuraz Gabashvili def.  Jan Minář /  Lukáš Rosol, 6–4, 2–6, [10–8]

References
Official site
ITF Search 
2009 Draws

 
ATP Challenger Trophy
2009 in Slovak tennis
STRABAG Challenger Open